Nidularium campos-portoi var. robustum is a plant in the genus Nidularium. This plant is endemic to Brazil.

References

campos-portoi var. robustum
Flora of Brazil